James Richard Davies (August 8, 1929 – June 11, 1966) was an American racecar driver in Champ cars  and midgets. He was the second man to win three USAC National Midget Championships.  When Davies won the  AAA Championship race at Del Mar, California on November 6, 1949 – aged 20 years, 2 months, 29 days, he became the youngest driver to win a race in a major U.S. open wheel series, a record not broken until Marco Andretti won the IRL race at Sonoma, California in 2006. Davies raced AAA on a false birth certificate showing him older (as did Troy Ruttman and Jim Rathmann), and was racing illegally.

Midget car career
In 1960 he won the USAC Pacific Coast Midget title as well as the National Midget Championship. He repeated as National Midget champion in 1961 and 1962. He won 46 feature events in the midgets in his career. Davies won the Night before the 500 midget race three times, in 1960 and 1961 at Kokomo Speedway, and next year at the Indianapolis Speedrome. Davies's midget car was stolen but was recovered a year later when a driver was killed in it at Sacramento. Davies recognized the car in the newspaper photos of the wreck.

Davies also had success racing midgets (called Speedcars down under) in Australia and New Zealand during his career. He won the 1963 Australian Speedcar Grand Prix at the Sydney Showground Speedway, as well as the 1963 and 1964 South Australian Speedcar Championships at the Rowley Park Speedway in Adelaide.

He died on June 11, 1966, aged 36, from injuries suffered in a midget crash at Santa Fe Speedway in suburban Chicago.

Career award
Inducted into the National Midget Auto Racing Hall of Fame in 1984.

Complete AAA/USAC Championship Car results

Indianapolis 500 results

* Shared drive with Art Cross, Johnny Parsons, Sam Hanks and Andy Linden

Complete Formula One World Championship results
(key)

 In 1954 Davies shared his drive with Art Cross, Johnny Parsons, Sam Hanks and Andy Linden. Davies also shared the 20th-placed car with Hanks and Jim Rathmann.
 Between 1950 and 1960, the Indianapolis 500 was included as part of the Formula One World Championship.

References

External links
 Profile on Historic Racing

1929 births
1966 deaths
American racing drivers
Indianapolis 500 drivers
Sportspeople from Glendale, California
Racing drivers from California
Racing drivers who died while racing
Sports deaths in Illinois
AAA Championship Car drivers